The Phineas Lawrence House is a historic house at 257 Trapelo Road in Waltham, Massachusetts.  The -story wood-frame house was built c. 1807-08 by Phineas Lawrence, member of the locally prominent Lawrence family, who had owned land in the northeastern part of Waltham since the 17th century.  The house is a well-preserved example of Federal styling.  The Lawrence properties were extensive, and included land that was used for the nearby Metropolitan State Hospital.

The house was listed on the National Register of Historic Places in 1987.

See also
National Register of Historic Places listings in Waltham, Massachusetts

References

Houses on the National Register of Historic Places in Waltham, Massachusetts
Federal architecture in Massachusetts
Houses completed in 1810
Houses in Waltham, Massachusetts